Princess Marie of Liechtenstein may refer to:

 Marie Fox, Princess Marie Henriette Adelaide of Liechtenstein (1851–1878), wife of Prince Louis of Liechtenstein
 Countess Marie Kinsky of Wchinitz and Tettau (1940–2021), wife of Prince Hans Adam II of Liechtenstein
 Princess Marie of Liechtenstein (b. 1959), wife of Prince Gundakar of Liechtenstein
 Princess Marie Gabriele Franciska Kálnoky de Köröspatak of Liechtenstein (born 1975), wife of Prince Constantin of Liechtenstein